Igor Vladimirovich Mazepa (27 June 1973 – 3 February 2014) was Russian racing driver and manager. He was the founder and team manager of the Russian Time team competing in the GP2 series.

Mazepa started his motorsports hobby at the age of 11 with karting after which he joined the car dealership. He has worked with the Russian ZIL factory team at the European Truck Championships after which he moved to the United States for seven years where he graduated from two universities while studying marketing. In 2008, Mazepa formed a karting team called Spartak Racing. The team has won two Russian karting championships in 2008 and 2009 in the (Rotax Max class).

In February 2014, Mazepa died of thrombosis, aged 40.

References

1973 births
2014 deaths
Russian motorsport people